Woman Without a Face is a 1947 Swedish drama film directed by Gustaf Molander and written by Ingmar Bergman.

Cast
 Alf Kjellin as Martin Grandé
 Anita Björk as Frida Grandé
 Gunn Wållgren as Rut Köhler
 Stig Olin as Ragnar Ekberg
 Olof Winnerstrand as Mr. Grandé, Martin's father
 Linnéa Hillberg as Mrs. Grandé, Martin's mother
 Georg Funkquist as Victor
 Marianne Löfgren as Charlotte, Rut's mother
 Åke Grönberg as Sam Svensson
 Sif Ruud as Magda Svensson

References

External links
 

1947 films
1947 drama films
1940s Swedish-language films
Swedish black-and-white films
Films directed by Gustaf Molander
Films with screenplays by Ingmar Bergman
Films scored by Erik Nordgren
Swedish drama films
1940s Swedish films